Jeļena Ostapenko (born 8 June 1997), also known as Aļona Ostapenko, is a Latvian professional tennis player. She has career-high WTA rankings of world No. 5 in singles, achieved on 19 March 2018, and world No. 7 in doubles, reached on 12 September 2022.

Ostapenko won the 2017 French Open singles title, becoming the first player from Latvia to win a Grand Slam singles tournament and the first unseeded player to win the French Open since 1933. In addition to her singles career, she has played as a member of the Latvia Fed Cup team. She has won seven singles and eight doubles titles on the ITF Women's Circuit, and she also won the junior singles event at the 2014 Wimbledon Championships.

Personal life
Ostapenko was born in Riga to former Ukrainian footballer Jevgēnijs Ostapenko (d. 2020) and Latvian-Russian tennis coach and former player Jeļena Jakovļeva. Jevgēnijs played professional football for Metalurh Zaporizhzhia in the Ukrainian city of Zaporizhzhia where Jeļena's grandmother lives. Jeļena has one half-brother, Maksim, who lives in the United States. She was introduced to tennis at age five by her mother and idolized Serena Williams while growing up. She also started dancing at that age, going on to compete in the National Latvian Championships for Ballroom Dancing. At the age of 12 she chose to focus on tennis, but she credits her good coordination and skilled footwork to her years of dancing. She speaks Latvian, Russian, and English.

Her legal name is Jeļena, but she is known to her family and friends as Aļona. When she was born, her parents' desired name of Aļona was not on the Latvian name calendar, so she was named Jeļena after her mother. Latvian authorities have now clarified, though, that there have been no restrictions in place that would not allow to register the desired name and most likely there has been some misunderstanding. Fans in Latvia and elsewhere in Eastern Europe had always called her Aļona, but the name was unknown in the West until her win at Roland Garros in 2017. She uses her legal name professionally in order to avoid administrative confusion.

Career

2014: Wimbledon junior champion and pro debut
Ostapenko won the singles event at the junior Wimbledon Championships and was ranked the No. 2 junior tennis player in the world in September 2014. She made her WTA Tour main-draw debut at the Tashkent Open, having been awarded a wildcard.

2015: Grand Slam main-draw debut
At the Ladies Neva Cup, Ostapenko went through qualifying and won the biggest title up to then.

At Wimbledon, Ostapenko defeated the ninth-seeded Carla Suárez Navarro in straight sets (dropping only two games in the match and grabbing her first win over a top-ten player) in the first round before losing to Kristina Mladenovic.

At the US Open, she lost her second-round match to Sara Errani.

In September, she reached her first career WTA Tour final at the Coupe Banque Nationale, where she lost to Annika Beck.

She ended the season as the world No. 79.

2016: First Premier-5 final, Wimbledon mixed-doubles semifinalist

She reached the final of the Qatar Open, a Premier 5 tournament in Doha, beating world No. 8, Petra Kvitová, on the way. She was beaten by Carla Suárez Navarro in the final, nevertheless she rose to No. 41 in the world rankings.

At the French Open, Ostapenko was seeded in the singles at a Grand Slam tournament for the first time in her career, but she dropped her opening match to Naomi Osaka.

At the Birmingham Classic, she beat Anastasia Pavlyuchenkova in straight sets during the first round, and she defeated two-time Wimbledon champion Petra Kvitová in the second. She was defeated by Madison Keys in the quarterfinals. She reached the semifinals of the mixed doubles at Wimbledon with Oliver Marach, but they fell to the eventual champions Heather Watson and Henri Kontinen.

Ostapenko made her Olympic debut at the 2016 Rio Summer Olympics where she lost to Samantha Stosur in the first round.

2017: French Open champion, top-10 debut
At the Australian Open, she advanced to the third round of a major for the first time, losing to Karolína Plíšková in three sets despite serving for the match in the third set.

At the Charleston Open, she reached the final losing to fellow 19-year-old Daria Kasatkina.

At the French Open, Ostapenko, then ranked 47th in the world, defeated Louisa Chirico, Monica Puig, Lesia Tsurenko, and Samantha Stosur. She then faced Caroline Wozniacki in the quarterfinals. Ostapenko came from a set down to defeat her, reaching her first Grand Slam semifinal. She was the first Latvian female player to do so and first teenager in a decade to reach the French Open semifinals (the last was Ana Ivanovic in 2007), opposite Timea Bacsinszky on 8 June, the birthday of both players. She beat Bacsinszky in three sets to reach the final, being the first unseeded female player to play in the final of the French Open since Mima Jaušovec in 1983 and the first Latvian player to reach the final of a major. In the final against third-seeded Simona Halep, Ostapenko came back from being down a set and 3–0 to win her first professional title. She became the first Latvian player to win a Grand Slam singles tournament and the first unseeded woman to win the French Open since 1933. Ostapenko also became the first player since Gustavo Kuerten to win his or her first career title at a Grand Slam tournament; coincidentally Kuerten won his first title at the 1997 French Open on the day Ostapenko was born. With the win, she reached a new career-high ranking of world No. 12.

At Wimbledon, Ostapenko beat Aliaksandra Sasnovich, Françoise Abanda, Camila Giorgi, and fourth-seeded Elina Svitolina en-route to her second Grand Slam quarterfinal. She lost to five-time champion Venus Williams.

Then, at the US Open, she reached the third round by defeating Lara Arruabarrena and Sorana Cîrstea, before losing to Daria Kasatkina. Her performance was enough for her to make her top-ten debut in the world rankings, at No. 10.

At the end of September, she won her second WTA title at the Korea Open in Seoul. In the Wuhan Open, she beat Barbora Strýcová and Monica Puig to reach the quarterfinals, where she scored her first win over a reigning WTA number one, Garbiñe Muguruza, extending her winning streak to eight in a row. She lost to Ashleigh Barty in the semifinal.

In October, she reached the semifinals of the China Open, losing to Simona Halep. At the WTA Finals, she scored a win over Karolína Plíšková but lost to Muguruza and Venus Williams.

She ended the season ranked No. 7 in the world.

2018: World No. 5, Wimbledon semifinal, French Open first-round loss
At Indian Wells, Ostapenko beat Belinda Bencic in the second round but lost to Petra Martić in the third. The result meant that she made her debut in the top 5.

She then played at the Miami Open, where she defeated the ninth-seeded Petra Kvitová in the fourth round and fourth-seeded Elina Svitolina in the quarterfinals, 7–6, 7–6. In the semifinal, Ostapenko defeated qualifier Danielle Collins to reach the final, in which she lost to 12th-seeded Sloane Stephens.

Ostapenko entered the French Open as the fifth seed, but failed to defend her title, losing in the first round to Kateryna Kozlova. Following the loss, she left the top ten for the first time since entering. At Wimbledon she beat Katy Dunne, Kirsten Flipkens, Vitalia Diatchenko and Aliaksandra Sasnovich to reach the quarterfinals for a second successive year, then beat Dominika Cibulková to reach her first Wimbledon semifinal, in which she lost to eventual winner Angelique Kerber. The rest of the season was rather disappointing, as a left wrist injury caused her to withdraw from the WTA Elite Trophy, and she ended the season ranked No. 22.

2019: Fall through the rankings, doubles success, late season resurgence

Ostapenko's first tournament of the year was the Shenzhen Open where she lost in the first round to Monica Niculescu. She went on to play at the Sydney International, where she lost to Ash Barty in the first round. At the Australian Open, Ostapenko was seeded 22nd and lost to Maria Sakkari, again in the first round. One commentator identified her tendency to hit a relatively high number of double faults, and frequent coaching changes, as contributing to her lack of success in 2019. At the French Open, she lost to Victoria Azarenka in the first round, but reached the quarterfinals of the doubles event with Lyudmyla Kichenok, falling to Elise Mertens and Aryna Sabalenka.

Ostapenko also lost in the first round of the Wimbledon Championships to Hsieh Su-wei. Despite the loss, alongside Robert Lindstedt she reached the first mixed-doubles final of her career, though they lost in straight sets to Latisha Chan and Ivan Dodig. During the tournament Ostapenko twice served a ball on the head of her partner Lindstedt.

At Jūrmala, Ostapenko was defeated in the first round by Bernarda Pera, but she reached the final of the doubles alongside Galina Voskoboeva; the pair lost to Sharon Fichman and Nina Stojanović. At Toronto, Ostapeonko defeated Caroline Garcia and Anastasia Pavlyuchenkova to reach the third round, before losing to qualifier Marie Bouzková; in doubles, she and partner Lyudmyla Kichenok lost in the first round to Julia Görges and Karolína Plíšková. At Cincinnati, she was defeated in the first round of the singles tournament by Yulia Putintseva, and, partnering with Kichenok once again in the doubles, defeated Raquel Atawo and Han Xinyun in the first round, before falling to Lucie Hradecká and Andreja Klepač, the eventual champions. Finally, she had some success at the US Open where she beat Aleksandra Krunić and 2019 Wimbledon quarterfinalist Alison Riske, in straight sets, to reach her first Grand Slam third round of the season where she faced wildcard Kristie Ahn to whom she lost in straight sets. In doubles, she and Kichenok were defeated in the first round by Caroline Dolehide and Vania King.

At Zhengzhou, she defeated You Xiaodi in the first round, before falling to Aryna Sabalenka. At Seoul, she lost to Tímea Babos in the first round, and also lost in the first round of the doubles tournament where, partnering with Kirsten Flipkens, she fell to Hayley Carter and Luisa Stefani. At Tashkent, she retired in the first round against Katarina Zavatska. At Beijing, she upset the second seed Plíšková in the first round, before falling to Kateřina Siniaková in the second. However, she went on to reach the biggest women's doubles final of her career at Beijing, partnering with Dayana Yastremska; they lost to Sofia Kenin and Bethanie Mattek-Sands. At Linz, Ostapenko defeated Tamara Korpatsch, Alizé Cornet, and Elena Rybakina en route to reach her first semifinal appearance since 2018 Wimbledon. In the semifinal, she came from a set and a break deficit to defeat Ekaterina Alexandrova in three tight sets. In her first final since Miami 2018, Ostapenko faced Coco Gauff, to whom she fell in three sets. At Linz, Ostapenko announced that she had hired fellow Grand Slam champion Marion Bartoli to her coaching team.

At Luxembourg, Ostapenko defeated Caty McNally in the first round, and then defeated top-seeded Elise Mertens in the second round. She then defeated Antonia Lottner and Anna Blinkova to reach the final, where she defeated defending champion Julia Görges in straight sets, to win her first title since Seoul in 2017.

2020–2021: First WTA 500 title, Olympics & fourth doubles title
Ostapenko withdrew from the 2020 Auckland Open following the death of her father. At the Australian Open, she defeated Liudmila Samsonova in the first round, before falling to Belinda Bencic in the second round. In doubles, she partnered Gabriela Dabrowski and reached the quarterfinals, and in mixed doubles, she partnered Leander Paes and lost in the second round to finalists Mattek-Sands and Jamie Murray.

After participating in the 2020–21 Billie Jean King Cup, where she lost to Serena Williams, but defeated Sofia Kenin before losing in the deciding doubles rubber to Kenin and Mattek-Sands, Ostapenko played at St. Petersburg, where she lost to Alizé Cornet in the first round whilst struggling with illness and jet lag.

In May 2021, Ostapenko reached the semifinals in doubles at the Madrid Open with Anastasia Pavlyuchenkova defeating en route the top seeded pair and world No. 1 and No. 3, Hsieh Su-wei and Elise Mertens. Next she reached the quarterfinals of a WTA 1000 tournament at the Italian Open, her first since 2018, by defeating Angelique Kerber. She had match points against Karolína Plíšková, but lost in a third set tiebreak. In the last tournament of the month, Ostapenko played Sofia Kenin in the first round of the French Open, but lost in the first round, in three sets.

Ostapenko won her fourth title as a wildcard at the Eastbourne International, defeating Anett Kontaveit in straight sets in the final. She became only the third wildcard to win the title, following Monica Seles in 1996 and Julie Halard-Decugis in 2000.

At Wimbledon, she reached the third round by defeating 31st seed Daria Kasatkina, but lost to Ajla Tomljanović in three sets.

At the 2020 Summer Olympics, Ostapenko was a flagbearer for Latvia alongside basketball player Agnis Čavars and entered the singles and doubles tournaments at the Games. She was defeated in the first round in the singles tournament by Elena Vesnina, in three sets. Ostapenko alongside Anastasija Sevastova also lost in the first round of the doubles tournament to Australia's Samantha Stosur and Ellen Perez.

For the beginning of the US Open Series, Ostapenko attended the Canadian Open unseeded and played against unseeded Kateřina Siniaková in the first round, but lost in straight sets. At the Cincinnati Open, also unseeded, she defeated Tamara Zidanšek in the first round and 13th seed Jennifer Brady (by retirement) in the second before losing to Angelique Kerber in the third.
Ostapenko ended the year winning the doubles title alongside Siniaková at the Kremlin Cup in Moscow.

2022: WTA 500 singles & 1000 doubles titles, Two Major semifinals & top 10 & WTA Finals debut in doubles
Ostapenko reached the third round at the Australian Open, falling to Barbora Krejčíková after taking the first set. 
At the Dubai Championships, she reached the final after defeating four Grand Slam champions: Kenin, Świątek, Kvitová and Halep in each round. She won the championship match against Veronika Kudermetova. This was her fifth title, and sixth final at WTA 500 level or above, and third final in the past nine months after a title run in Eastbourne and a runner-up showing in Luxembourg the previous year. She returned to the top 15 at world No. 13 in the WTA singles rankings. At the same tournament, she made also the final in doubles, partnering Lyudmyla Kichenok but they were defeated by Kudermetova and Mertens.

At the Qatar Open, Ostapenko lost in the semifinals against Anett Kontaveit. In her next three singles matches at Indian Wells, Miami, and Madrid, she lost in the first round. In Madrid, she reached the semifinals in doubles with Lyudmyla Kichenok losing to Gabriela Dabrowski and Giuliana Olmos. Her woes continued with a first-round loss at the Italian Open. At the French Open, Ostapenko lost in the second round to Alizé Cornet in three sets. In doubles, at the same tournament she reached the semifinals of a Major for the first time partnering again with Kichenok.

At Wimbledon, she reached the fourth round in singles where she lost to Tatjana Maria. At the same tournament, she reached the doubles semifinals, partnering also with Kichenok, and mixed doubles quarterfinals, partnering Robert Farah.
At the Cincinnati Open, she reached the second round in singles, defeating Beatriz Haddad Maia before losing to Madison Keys. In doubles with Kichenok, she reached the final defeating Australian Open finalists Haddad Maia and Anna Danilina and top seeds Kudermetova and Mertens. The pair won their biggest title defeating Nicole Melichar-Martinez and Ellen Perez. As a result, Ostapenko reached the top 10 at world No. 9 in the doubles rankings on 22 August 2022 and reached a career-high doubles ranking of No. 7 on 12 September 2022 after a third round showing in doubles at the US Open.

She qualified for the 2022 WTA Finals with Kichenok where they reached the semifinals.

She ended the season ranked No. 18 in singles and No. 14 in doubles.

2023: Australian Open quarterfinalist
She reached the quarterfinals of the 2023 Australian Open becoming the first Latvian women’s player to reach this level at this Major defeating top-10 player Coco Gauff. This was only her fourth Major quarterfinal in her career and first since 2018.

Playing style

Ostapenko is an aggressive baseliner, with an attacking playing style. In a 2017 article, Steve Tignor of Tennis.com described Ostapenko's mentality as "See ball, hit winner." Eurosport labeled her style as "risky, aggressive, fun tennis".

Her forehand and backhand are both hit flat, with relentless power and depth. In a 2016 interview, Crosscourt View labeled Ostapenko's backhand her "strongest weapon"; the same year, Hartford Courant stated that she "hits a lot of forehand winners". Due to her aggressive playing style, she accumulates significant numbers of both winners and unforced errors. She aims to finish points quickly, either with powerful groundstrokes or deft volleys. Ostapenko moves opponents around the court by aiming long strokes at corners and lines, and then changes direction to hit powerful winners. After putting an opponent in a vulnerable position, she regularly seeks to end the point with a cross-court forehand, a down-the-line backhand, a swinging volley, or a drop shot. Before her participation in the 2017 Charleston Open final, an article on the event's website declared that what was "most impressive about Ostapenko is her willingness to strike big to all corners of the court, be it a cross-court laser or a bold down-the-line winner." One of her major weaknesses is a high error rate due to her high-risk approach. 

At the 2017 French Open, where Ostapenko won her first professional title, she regularly hit between 35 and 45 winners throughout her matches. Following her quarterfinal performance, she attracted multiple comparisons to Monica Seles. Ostapenko said in an interview at the event that "aggressive is my style of game". After the final match of that French Open, analysts highlighted the differences between her performance and opponent Simona Halep's performance: Ostapenko had 54 winners and 54 unforced errors, while Halep had eight winners and ten unforced errors. ESPN's Simon Cambers wrote "Fear just does not seem to come into [Ostapenko's] vocabulary... Her groundstrokes are simply massive, flat swipes of the ball that left Halep... grasping at shadows."

The major weakness in Ostapenko's game is her serve, which is highly inconsistent. Her first serve is powerful, being typically recorded at 106 mph (170 km/h), and peaking at 112 mph (180 km/h), allowing her to serve aces, whilst her second serve is inconsistent. Her second serve is hampered by nerves, and a frequently wayward ball toss, meaning that she double faults frequently. In 2017 and 2019, she was the WTA Tour leader in double faults, hitting 436 double faults in 2019. She also frequently has one of the lowest first serve percentages on the entire tour; in her first-round match at the 2019 China Open against Karolína Plíšková, she served 25 double faults, and had a first-serve percentage of 49%, whilst still winning the match. However, after partnering with Marion Bartoli at Linz, her serve began to show some improvement, and in the final against Julia Görges at Luxembourg, she did not double fault once.

Equipment
Ostapenko uses Wilson Blade racquets, but is currently without an apparel sponsor, having previously been sponsored by Adidas for clothing and shoes; and Nike prior to that. At the  Australian Open, French Open and Wimbledon 2022 she wore DK ONE, a Latvian brand.

Coaches
Ostapenko is coached by her mother, with her father serving as a fitness trainer. In 2017, she also trained with two-time French Open doubles champion Anabel Medina Garrigues. She parted company with Medina Garrigues at the end of 2017, taking on David Taylor – former coach of Sam Stosur and Ana Ivanovic – to coach her for the majors, with her mother remaining as her full-time coach. In October 2019, Ostapenko partnered with 2013 Wimbledon champion Marion Bartoli on a trial basis; their partnership resulted in Ostapenko reaching two finals in two weeks, and winning the title in Luxembourg. Bartoli announced that their partnership would continue into 2020, and that she would be Ostapenko's full time coach throughout the year. After a poor start to the 2020 season, and Bartoli's pregnancy, Ostapenko ended their partnership during the suspension of the WTA Tour due to the COVID-19 pandemic, and began to be coached on a trial basis by Thomas Högstedt, the former coach of Maria Sharapova and Simona Halep. This partnership was not extended into 2021, and Bartoli began coaching Ostapenko once again in February 2021, following the birth of her daughter, at Doha. Ostapenko subsequently started working with Ukrainian coach Stas Khmarsky.

Records
Between 2016 and 2019, Ostapenko was the only player to have won a Grand Slam title (2017 French Open), but lost in the first round the three other times she had competed at the same tournament (2016 to Naomi Osaka, 2018 to Kateryna Baindl, and 2019 to Victoria Azarenka). This run ended in 2020, as she advanced to the second round after beating Madison Brengle.

Career statistics

Grand Slam singles performance timeline

Grand Slam tournament finals

Singles: 1 (title)

Mixed doubles: 1 (runner–up)

Awards

References

External links

 
 
 
 
 
 
 

1997 births
Living people
Sportspeople from Riga
Latvian female tennis players
French Open champions
Wimbledon junior champions
Grand Slam (tennis) champions in women's singles
Grand Slam (tennis) champions in girls' singles
Tennis players at the 2014 Summer Youth Olympics
Tennis players at the 2016 Summer Olympics
Olympic tennis players of Latvia
Latvian people of Ukrainian descent
Tennis players at the 2020 Summer Olympics
Latvian people of Russian descent